Grete Weiskopf (11 May 1905 – 15 March 1966), known by the pseudonym Alex Wedding, was a German writer of children's and young adult fiction.

Life

Born Grete Bernheim in Salzburg, she initially worked as a typist, bookseller, and bank clerk in Berlin. In 1928 she married the Czech-born author Franz Carl Weiskopf, a member of the German Communist Party and the Association of Proletarian-Revolutionary Authors. In 1931 she authored her first young adult novel, Ede und Unku, which was among the books destroyed during the Nazi book burnings. In 1933 she and her husband fled to Prague; in 1939 they fled via Paris to New York City.

After the Second World War the couple returned to Prague for a brief period. That same year, Franz began working in the diplomatic service, which led to assignments in Washington, DC and Stockholm. From 1950 to 1952 they lived in the People's Republic of China, where she worked as a translator and journalist. From 1953 until her death she lived in East Germany. She and her husband are buried in a Zentralfriedhof Friedrichsfelde.

Career

During her life in East Germany, Weiskopf wrote children's and young adult novels and short stories. Her two most successful books are Ede und Unku and The Arctic Ocean, which were both adapted into films. She was considered a pioneer of socialist children's literature.

Honors
 She is the namesake of a literary prize, the Alex-Wedding-Preis, awarded since 1968.
 On 27 January 2011, on the occasion of the Day of Remembrance for the Victims of Nation Socialism, a path in Friedrichshain was renamed Ede-und-Unku-Weg in memory of Weiskopf's most celebrated novel.
 Since 2009 a street on Alexanderplatz between Karl-Liebknecht-, Knebel-, and Wadzeckstrasse is named Alex-Wedding-Strasse.

Works
 1931: Ede und Unku
 1936: Das Eismeer ruft 
 1948: Die Fahne des Pfeiferhänsleins
 1948: Söldner ohne Sold, Ein Roman für die Jugend 1952: Das eiserne Büffelchen 1961: Die Drachenbraut. Chinesische Volksmärchen 1963: Hubert, das Flusspferd. (based on the true story of Huberta)
 1965: Im Schatten des Baobab. Märchen und Fabeln aus AfrikaFilmography
Adaptations
 1961: Das Eismeer ruft (Ledove more vola), directed by Hanus Burger
 1980: Als Unku Edes Freundin war, directed by Helmut Dziuba
 1982: Das große Abenteuer des Kaspar Schmeck, directed by Gunter Friedrich
 1984: Das Eismeer ruft, directed by Jörg Foth

Scripts
 1957: Lissy 1964: FerientageFurther reading
 Astrid Fernengel: Kinderliteratur im Exil, Tectum, Marburg, 2008, Diss. TU Berlin 2006
 Manfred Orlick: Reminiszenz an Alex Wedding (zum 50. Todestag). In: Ossietzky, Volume 6, 2016, S. 208–210, online bei sopos.org.
 Werner Röder; Herbert A. Strauss: International Biographical Dictionary of Central European Émigrés 1933-1945''. Vol.2, Munich: Saur, 1983 , S. 1212

References

External links

 Straßenbenennung, Female personalities in Berlin Mitte
 Information on Grete Weiskopf at KinderundJugendmedien.de
 Alex-Wedding-Archiv in the Archive of the Academy of Arts, Berlin

1905 births
1966 deaths
East German writers
East German women
German children's writers
German women novelists
20th-century German women writers
German women children's writers